Sergey Grigoryev (born 7 October 1937) is a Soviet racewalker. He competed in the men's 50 kilometres walk at the 1968 Summer Olympics and the 1972 Summer Olympics.

References

1937 births
Living people
Athletes (track and field) at the 1968 Summer Olympics
Athletes (track and field) at the 1972 Summer Olympics
Soviet male racewalkers
Olympic athletes of the Soviet Union
Place of birth missing (living people)